Jacques Newashish (1958) is a Canadian film actor, filmmaker, painter, and sculptor. Newashish is a member of the Atikamekw nation and is from Wemotaci, Quebec. He was born in La Tuque, Quebec where he learned traditional values and ways of living. His father was a trapper and hunter and the language and culture of the Atikamekw people. Newashish incorporates elements of Atikamekw culture into his artistic practice and is concerned with the preservation of the Atikamekw language and culture in the community.

As a multidisciplinary artist, Newashish works across a variety of mediums, including sculpture, painting, film, and storytelling. His work includes installations which frequently use natural materials which reflect Atikamekw culture.

Newashish garnered a Canadian Screen Award nomination for Best Supporting Actor at the 5th Canadian Screen Awards for his performance in Before the Streets (Avant les rues). In 2021 he appeared in the film Bootlegger.

References

External links

Jacques Newashish at Sacred Fire Productions

Atikamekw people
Canadian male film actors
Male actors from Quebec
Artists from Quebec
Algonquin people
First Nations male actors
First Nations sculptors
First Nations painters
People from Mauricie
Living people
Year of birth missing (living people)